Capital Crime Writers (CCW) is a non-profit crime and mystery writing organization located in Ottawa, Ontario, Canada. It was founded in 1988 by Linda Wiken and Audrey Jessup.

CCW has 125 members.

Monthly meetings include presentations from expert guest speakers on topics related to the craft of crime and mystery writing. Authors who have presented to CCW include Louise Penny, Vicki Delany, and Maureen Jennings, Barbara Fradkin and Debra Komar.

Annual Short Story Contest
CCW sponsors the annual Capital Crime Writer's short story contest for the Audrey Jessup award.  Deadline for submissions is April 1.  The contest is open to the National Capital Region and CCW members regardless of location.

Organization
CCW is run by 6 executive board members. A slate of candidates is offered every year for elections at the Annual General Meeting in May.

2017 Executive board members and committee members include:
Past President Michael Murphy,
Patricia Filteau President,
Elizabeth Hosang Vice-President,
Elizabeth Hosang Treasurer,
Mary Fernando Program Director,
Pam Isfeld Program Committee,
Jeff Ross Communications Director,
Past Presidents include Barbara Fradkin, Brenda Chapman and Ken Gibson.

References

 Government of Ontario Writing & Publishing listings
 CBC news story on CCW author Barbara Fradkin winning the Arthur Ellis Award
  Article on Linda Wiken:  Founding member of CCW and owner of Prime Crime Bookshop
  Capital Crime Writer's 20th Anniversary Event; Appearance by CCW member Rick Mofina
 Crime Writers of Canada
 On-line guide to Writing in Canada: CCW Event Listing
 Mystery Authors On line
 Capital Crime Writers in partnership with Ottawa Public Library for 20th Anniversary Event.  Author Mary Jane Maffini appearing.

External links
   Official CCW Website
  Canadian Authors Association link to Capital Crime Writers

Canadian writers' organizations
Mystery and detective fiction awards
Short story awards
Canadian literary awards